Richard N. Gottfried (born May 16, 1947) is an American attorney and politician who served as a member of the New York State Assembly representing portions of Manhattan. Gottfried had been a member of the Assembly for more than 50 years, making him the longest-serving member of the body and one of the longest-serving state legislators in the United States.

Early life and education 
Gottfried was born in New York City. He is a graduate of Stuyvesant High School, where he was a classmate of Jerrold Nadler and Dick Morris. Gottfried earned a Bachelor of Arts degree from Cornell University in 1968 and a Juris Doctor from Columbia Law School in 1973.

Career 
Richard Gottfried represents District 75 in the New York State Assembly, which includes Murray Hill, Chelsea, Clinton, portions of Midtown Manhattan and the Upper West Side. Gottfried is a progressive Democrat who has been endorsed by the Democratic and Working Families parties.

Elected to the Assembly in 1970, while a matriculating student at Columbia Law School, Gottfried serves as chairman of the Assembly Committee on Health and is also a member of the Committees on Higher Education and Rules. He is also a member of the Assembly Steering Committee and the head of the Manhattan Assembly Delegation.

Some of his pieces of legislation-bills enacted into law that he has primary or secondary responsibility for include the creation of the Prenatal Care Assistance Program  as well as the Child Health Plus and Family Health Plus programs. He is also the author of the Physician Profiling Law, which allows patients to access information about their primary care physician; the Family Health Care Decisions Act, which prioritizes who would make health care decisions for a person who does not have a health care proxy and is incapacitated; and the Health Care Proxy Law-which allows individuals to designate a secondary party to make critical health care decisions for them if they become incapacitated-as well as the HIV Testing and Confidentiality Law.

Gottfried was the sponsor of the 1998 Hudson River Park Law, which established that park, as well as the legislation to expand the Jacob Javits Convention Center. He was also instrumental in the enaction of the Omnibus Crime Act of 1978 and drafting of the 1976 Juvenile Justice Reform Act.

As chair of the Health Committee, and as a supporter of reproductive freedom, he seeks to keep New York pro-choice, and sponsored Gov. Spitzer's Reproductive Health and Privacy Protection Act.

Gottfried introduced the first same-sex marriage bill in the Assembly in 2003. When then-Governor Eliot Spitzer submitted it as a governor's program bill in 2007, Assembly Member Daniel O'Donnell, one of the Assembly's openly-gay members, became the lead sponsor. Marriage equality became law in New York State in June 2011.

Other bills he sponsors are: GENDA, the Gender Non-Discrimination Act which would make discrimination based on gender identity illegal; and a bill to legalize the use of medical marijuana.

As a leading advocate for patient autonomy, he has a major responsibility for New York's managed care reforms, and continues to sponsor legislation for stronger protections for consumers and health care providers, work toward public support for universal access to quality, affordable health care, and establish end-of-life and pain management protocols. Gottfried's NY Health bill, to establish universal, publicly funded health coverage, was the first of its kind to pass a legislative body (NYS Assembly, 1992).

During his time as a member of the Assembly Gottfried has served in various leadership capacities, including as Deputy Majority Leader, Assistant Majority Leader, Chairman of the Assembly Committee on Codes, and Children and Families, as well as Chairman of the Assembly Task Force on the Homeless, Campaign Finance Reform and Crime Victims. In his 2010 re-election bid he received 82% of the vote.

Retirement from NYS Assembly 
On December 13, 2021, Gottfried, then the longest serving member of the New York State Assembly, announced he would not seek re-election in 2022 thus ending his tenure in the Assembly after (what will be) a record 18,993 days in office.

References 

1947 births
Living people
Jewish American state legislators in New York (state)
People from Manhattan
Cornell University alumni
Columbia Law School alumni
Democratic Party members of the New York State Assembly
American Civil Liberties Union people
Activists from New York (state)
21st-century American politicians
20th-century American politicians
21st-century American Jews